H2356-309 is a blazar (a type of active galactic nucleus) located behind the Sculptor Wall.

Discovery
Using the Chandra X-ray Observatory and the XMM-Newton, scientists have detected a warm-hot intergalactic medium (WHIM) between galaxies in the Sculptor Wall. Scientists observed the absorption of a background light source in the warm-hot intergalactic medium. This background source is the blazar H2356-309.

Application
Characteristics of this absorption in the Sculptor Wall by the oxygen atoms in particular are similar to the absorption of the oxygen atoms in warm-hot intergalactic medium, giving scientists more assurance they can find other sources that compare to warm-hot intergalactic medium. There are also similarities in the predicted temperature and density of the warm-hot intergalactic medium compared to the Sculptor Wall.

References 

Blazars
Quasars
Sculptor (constellation)